Dr. Eckart Conze (born October 17, 1963) is a German historian, author, and professor of modern history at the University of Marburg in Hesse. 

He has authored and co-authored more than thirty books and papers on modern German, European and international history, including works in English published by Cambridge University Press. His interviews and writing have appeared in German news magazine Der Spiegel.

His book The Search for Security garnered him the prize for promoting the translation of humanities works by the Börsenverein des Deutschen Buchhandels in 2009.

He was a member of the Independent Commission of Historians, tasked by the German Federal Foreign Office in 2005 to study the conduct of German diplomats in Nazi Germany and in the Federal Republic. The commission published its findings on October 21, 2010 in a book entitled The Office and the Past.

He is the Deputy Chairperson of the Board of Trustees of the Wolf-Erich-Kellner Memorial Foundation, commemorating its namesake German historian, archivist, and FDP politician.

Literature

References

1963 births
20th-century German historians
Living people
Academic staff of the University of Marburg
21st-century German historians